Pebobs is a genus of moths in the family Cosmopterigidae.

Description

Adult

Pebobs species are very small to small moths in the family Cosmopterigidae. Forewing length of 2.9-4.3 mm. The external features are as in Cosmopterix. Wing venation with 12 veins in forewing and 7 veins in hindwing. Forewing with Sc and R1-R5 to costa; R5 stalked with M1; M1-CuA2 to termen; CuP very weak and not reaching termen; 1A+2A with basal fork, to dorsum. Hindwing Sc along costa and joining Rs at three-quarters; M1-CuA2 to termen; veins often not fully developed due to the narrow shape of the hindwing.

Biology
The biology has only been described for Pebobs ipomoeae. The one known life cycle does not differ from those of the known life cycles of Cosmopterix species.

Species
Pebobs aitne Koster, 2010
Pebobs elara Koster, 2010
Pebobs ipomoeae (Busck, 1900)
Pebobs isonoe Koster, 2010
Pebobs kale Koster, 2010
Pebobs sanctivincenti (Walsingham, 1891)
Pebobs tetragramma (Meyrick, 1915)

References

 
Cosmopteriginae